Electricity is a 2014 British film directed by Bryn Higgins, starring Agyness Deyn, Lenora Crichlow and Christian Cooke. the film is about the journey seen through the eyes of a young woman with epilepsy. Electricity is an adaptation of the 2006 novel by Ray Robinson. It was produced in Saltburn-by-the-Sea in June 2013; some filming was carried out in London and in North East England. The film was released on 12 December 2014.

Plot
Lily O'Connor, a Northerner with epilepsy, finds out her brother, who she had believed to be dead, may be alive. She leaves her safe, routine life and goes to London to find him. Epilepsy colours her perceptions and the film shows how she views everyday objects and places as obstacles and dangers.

Cast 
 Agyness Deyn as Lily O'Connor
 Christian Cooke as Mikey O'Connor
 Paul Anderson as Barry O'Connor	
 Alice Lowe as Sylvia
 Lenora Crichlow as Mel
 Tom Georgeson as Al
 Ben Batt as Dave
 Millie Taylforth as Young Lily
 Jake Gibbons as Young Mikey
 Melissa Sinden as Sylvia's mother

Reception
On review aggregator Rotten Tomatoes, the film holds an approval rating of 79% based on 19 reviews, with an average rating of 6.4/10.

References

External links 
 

2014 films
2014 drama films
British drama films
Films based on British novels
Films set in Yorkshire
Films set in London
Epilepsy
2010s English-language films
2010s British films